The 2007 Britcar 24 Hour or 2007 24 Hours of Silverstone was an automobile endurance race, organised by Britcar, held from 8 to 9 September 2007 at Silverstone Circuit. It was the 3rd edition of the Britcar 24 Hour event. The race was won by Duller Motorsport, running a BMW Z4, driven by Dieter Quester, Dirk Werner, Tim Mullen and Jamie Campbell-Walter.

The race is also well known for having been featured on Top Gear, Season 10, Episode 9, in which Jeremy Clarkson, Richard Hammond and James May along with The Stig (Ben Collins) participated in.

Entry list
60 Cars were entered into the event.

Qualifying
The grid for the race was decided by times set in day qualifying. Night qualifying was held as a practice event ahead of the actual race's night segment.

Day qualifying
Stuart Hall set the fastest time of the session in the Rollcentre Mosler MT900R GT3, a 1:54.027 on the car's 14th flying lap. In GTC, the #32 Duller BMW had set the fastest lap, Intersport's #46 car had qualified on pole in Class 1 with TJH Motorsport on Class 2 pole, Team Thrush set the pace in Class 3 as Saxon Motorsport put their BMW 330d 6 places ahead of the next Class 4 car, in 47th overall. Simply Racing's Porsche 964 hadn't set a time as the engine had failed and the KTF Chrysler hadn't met noise levels with certain restrictions in place so it could not take part.

Fastest in class in bold.

Night qualifying
This session required every driver in each car to do at least 3 laps. In the second session, a Mosler was yet again at the top of the times, this being the #10 Chad Motorsport car of Michael Vergers and Michael and Sean McInerney. In GTC and Class, BMWs were again on top, with Duller Motorsport and Intersport dominating their classes. This was followed by TJH Motorsport yet again beating ELR to the fastest time in Class 2. The Boston Bowl MG ZR 190 of Cole, Wahlgren and Walker had finished the session over a session quicker than Team Thrush's Honda Integra. Team Top Gear, completely new to endurance racing, had put their car in 1st in Class 4, with Ben Collins, otherwise known as The Stig, setting a 2:18.296. Woes would strike the newcomers though, as during May's stint, the turbo and clutch had gone, putting their start of the race in serious doubt.

Fastest in class in bold.

Race

Report
Pre-race

While having lunch, a few hours before the race start, Clarkson, May and Hammond discussed who would go out in the car at the start, with their vote being inconclusive, they asked for the assistance of the spectators, who almost unanimously voted for The Stig to start the race. As more than 50 cars made their way onto the grid, the #78 BMW, among other cars, was still in the garage. 20 minutes to go, the car's engine was working. The field had begun to set off on the formation lap, with some cars absent; #5 J&S Porsche due to a valve, the #16 TVR Sagaris of Michael Caine had failed to start and would subsequently start from the pits. The Top Gear BMW was fuelled, with Collins getting in the car as Clarkson hurried them out of the garage, the BMW cruising at pit-lane speed to join 5 other cars starting from the pits; the #79 VW, #63 Honda, #45 BMW, #5 Porsche and the #16 TVR.

Hour 1

The race had begun, Vergers took the inside line ahead of Hall into Copse, followed by Werner in the #1 BMW. Team Top Gear's BMW had made it to the end of the pit lane just as the KTF Group Chrysler Viper GTS-R (60th on the grid) crossed the line, meaning they had started the race. Quickly, Vergers fell behind both the Rollcentre Mosler and the Duller BMW by lap 3, with the #1 car taking the lead on the next lap from Hall's Mosler. The first retirement of the race had also occurred on this lap, the #5 J&S Porsche had blown its new engine already. The #59 Phatgixer BMW had stopped on track at Brooklands, only completing 20 laps. The Rollcentre team quickly hit further trouble as Alan Bonner in #52 Windrush BMW collided with Hall at Brooklands as he was trying to lap the backmarker, this and a spin at Becketts, put him down to third place as the #10 Chad Mosler chased after the 2006 race-winning BMW, although 20 seconds adrift. Robert Huff, who was driving the KTF Group Viper, had managed to move the ex-Le Mans class winner from 60th to 8th overall in one hour. From 59th, counting the pit-lane start, the Team Top Gear BMW, driven by Stig, was up to an astonishing 45th place and only second in class. As the first hour had been completed, Werner was nearly 40 seconds clear of Hall, as Vergers had fallen behind the latter by over a lap.

Hour 2

The #10 Chad Mosler pits with Vergers swapping with Michael McInerney. At this stage, Werner had extended the gap from the #2 Mosler to 50 seconds, as Duller's second car, the #32 BMW M3 E46 GTR had taken third place. Soon after, Hall headed into the pits for the Rollcentre team's first of many stops, making it a Duller Motorsport 1-2 for the time being. 20 minutes later, Werner pulls into the pits, for Dieter Quester to get in the car, which allows Fabrizio Gollin to unlap himself and subsequently take the lead of the race 90 minutes in. The #15 Chad Motorsport car of Greensall now leads after Gollin pits, not long after taking the lead the Porsche heads into the pit lane for its first stop, as David Leslie takes the lead in the #26 GTS BMW which is yet to pit. A problem with the fuel injection system forced Stig to pit the #78 BMW. Meanwhile, the #27 Marcos of Cor Euser's Marcos Racing International team, had been called into the pits for an oil leak, then hit further troubles due to noise too loud for limits currently in place, not receiving the clearance from scrutineers. A jammed wheel nut forced the pitting of the #15 Chad Porsche, losing valuable time and dropping it far outside of the top twenty. The #58 Moore Racing BMW had a wheel come off, resulting in the three-wheeled M3 E36 driven by Gardiner crawling back to the pits. Leslie pits just before 2 hours are up to hand over to Joe Macari with the Duller Motorsport BMW Z4 M Coupé retaking the lead however only 20 seconds clear of Stuart hall at the 2-hour mark.

Hour 3

By this point, Kevin Clarke's #46 Intersport BMW had retired after only completing 13 laps, leaving the Donaldson duo drive-less for the rest of the weekend. Quester was leading Hall by 10 seconds but the Mosler had quickly closed down the gap to just 2 seconds until a backmarker spun going into the Vale chicane, allowing Hall to get ahead of Quester who was lapping another car. At this time, the #78 BMW is able to rejoin the race, but with James May at the wheel as Stig had exited the car having only completed half of his planned stint. The #27 Marcos had finally rejoined the race after passing a noise test as the #15 Chad Porsche gets back on track but down in 44th. 30 minutes into hour 3, the #3 Mosler is finally brought in for its first driver change, 20 seconds clear of Quester, with Andy Neate taking over driving duties, with the ex-BTCC driver rejoining in fourth place as George Haynes brings the #8 Mosler in for Del Delaronde for his first stint. Neate had begun to lap quicker than the next three cars in front of him, which had not pitted yet. The KTF Group Viper had rejoined the race after Huff brought it in over an hour ago, Ken Finneran at the wheel this time but the car was not out for long as another oil leak made the car pit-bound. Meanwhile, the #40 RJN Nissan was handed a black and orange flag for missing a fuel cap, which cost them a lot of time in the pits trying to find another.

Hour 4

By hour 4 of the race, the bright sky has faded and drivers are told to turn on their lights. After mechanical problems hindering its performance, on its 30th lap, the #16 Trackpower TVR has a massive collision with the barrier going out of Copse and into Maggotts, bringing out the Safety Car, this helping Andy Neate close the gap to the second place GTS Motorsport BMW which in turn is only 20 behind the leading Duller BMW. Both the #1 BMW and #10 Mosler are handed a stop-go penalty for passing under yellow flags, Jamie Campbell-Walter, now in the car, manages to retain his lead after serving the penalty. Eventually, Neate manages to taken second from the #26 BMW, shortly after though, Neate pits to hand over to Martin Short. The #4 Apex Motorsport Jaguar XKR GT3 gets called into the pits for a noise problem, as Jeremy Clarkson starts his first stint. The safety car comes out for a second time due to oil down at Stowe.

Hour 5

After around 25 minutes, the safety car pulls into the pits, the #26 GTS BMW immediately heads into the pits for a refuel. The #1 and #32 Duller BMWs lead the #2 Rollcentre Mosler with the #26 GTS BMW still in the top four as the #39 Paragon Porsche and #24 Topcat Marcos are laps down on it.

Hour 6

Slowly making its way up the order, the #10 Mosler has moved into 12th place. The Apex Jaguar has rejoined the field, only just inside the top 30 positions as the #15 Porsche up into 32nd after the wheel nut issues. Trouble strikes the Topcats crew as the Marcos' rear lights stop working, forcing it to make a pit stop, massively impacting its chances for the GTC class win. The #32 Duller car pits with left rear damage, losing over 10 laps in the process. Michael Vergers pits the Chad Motorsport Mosler due to a suspected engine-turned oil issue, repairs cost them dearly, pushing them down to 16th. Campbell-Walter pits the BMW Z4 to allow Johannes Stuck to start his first stint in the car. The EDM Motorsport BMW had pitted due to a problem with the driver's seat, despite this, the car had gotten back into the top ten before another issue forcing Christian Vann to pit, dropping him outside the top twenty. Further troubles for the #55 Torquespeed team after they had been running outside the top twenty for the entire race so far until a broken front strut bar had to be replaced, pushing Rob Barff further down the order.

Hour 7

In the pitch-black night, the Safety Car is once again deployed due to debris down somewhere on the circuit, using this to their advantage, the Rollcentre Mosler pits, 4 laps down on the leading Duller Motorsport BMW, the team also changing brake pads while they can afford to, only losing a lap. Meanwhile, The Chad Motorsport Porsche has put itself back into the top twenty, 19th overall. Stuart Hall pits the Mosler with an alternator problem, costing them a lot of time. The #26 GTS car, 2nd at the time, Rob Wilson replaces Joe Macari in the BMW. The Chad Motorsport team's bad luck would again impact their race, as Michael Vergers collided with Richard Hammond and caused major damage to the car. Hammond had allowed several cars to overtake and lap him going out of Chapel, then moved back towards the racing line not realising the Mosler was there and made heavy contact. Sparks flew as Hammond parked the wrecked BMW on the right-hand side of the back straight as the Mosler continued on a couple-hundred feet, the front of the car badly damaged. The Top Gear BMW also sustained severe damage to the left-hand side; a broken wishbone, brake disc, a damaged engine and considerable bodywork damage. This boosted Chad Motorsport's other car, the #15 Porsche up the order, now 18th overall. Meanwhile, Rollcentre had successfully changed the alternator, the Mosler rejoining the race in 11th place.

Hour 8

The KTF Group Chrysler Viper GTS-R had just gotten back on track before a prop shaft failure confirmed the car's retirement after a dismal weekend. The GP Motorsport has retired from the race after a hard hit into the barriers and subsequent roll at Copse with Ed Lovett at the wheel. Meanwhile, the #47 Duke Video has also retired from brake issues, after contact with Fiona Leggate. The Rollcentre Mosler has quickly moved through the field and into 5th position, only four laps behind the Duller Motorsport BMW M3.

Hour 9

The Chad Mosler has once again rejoined the race, far outside of the top thirty. Martin Rich in the #8 Eclipse Mosler has started to close the gap between himself and Stuck, still over 10 laps ahead. Unfortunately, the Mosler woes would hit the Eclipse team, driveshaft problems hindering their charge as the Paragon Porsche and Duller M3 moving into the top three as a result.

Hour 10

Chad Motorsport has called in the Mosler as the engine is experiencing problems from the incident with the Top Gear BMW which has recently rejoined after repairs made to the car were deemed safe to run. Michael Mallock pits the #57 Nissan, accidentally turning on the central locking system, but was able to press the release button. The #10 Mosler rejoins the race after some repairs were made. Later on, the Mosler being involved in a collision with the #41 Lotus. Jamie Campbell-Walter pitted with a healthy lead, giving Johannes Stuck his second stint in the BMW Z4. Duller Motorsport leads 1–2 with the #32 car still over 10 laps behind.

Hour 11

The battle for 10th is heated, the #62 ELR Honda and the #28 Morgan. Not long after, Tom Shrimpton pits to make a scheduled driver change and a brake pad change, the car nor driver not putting a foot wrong. The #65 Class 2 TJH Honda up into the top 10, nearing a top 5 overall position, only 1 lap behind the CWS Racing BMW, eventually overtaking the #45 car as it makes a pit stop.

Hour 12

After its troubles, the #15 Chad Porsche has moved up to 10th, behind the older 964 car run by Simply Racing. After the team's slight delay in its most recent pit stop, the #57 Nissan slotted into 14th position, with the Apex Motorsport Jaguar XKR GT3 18th in its first-ever race meeting. Meanwhile, the Chesterton Commercial Holdings Marcos' gearbox problems have come back to bite them, with the team making a new gearbox out of the two broken ones whilst the ISL Marcos has been missing third gear for a large portion of the race but is still running. Low-visibility is becoming a concerning factor as the Safety Car is on stand-by. With the BMW repaired to an operational condition, Team Top Gear made the decision to put The Stig in the car, in an attempt to make up for horribly lost time.

Hours 13, 14 and 15

Just as half-distance is reached, fog starts to roll in. The TJH Honda Civic Type R pits, dropping outside of the top ten as Adam Sharpe brings in the Eclipse Mosler with a problematic left-rear driveshaft once again, only taking 12 minutes to replace. Further drama would occur in the pitlane as a Saxon Motorsport mechanic is injured as the car is dropped off the jack, fortunately, the injury is not severe. The fog and mist continue to get worse, visibility becoming very limited. The race is then suspended, with the remaining cars lining up on the pit straight in parc ferme conditions until it is safe to continue. The suspension would remain until 7 am, nearing the end of Hour 15.

Hour 16

The race is back underway as trouble for the Topcats team after running so consistently in the top 10 for so long; a broken differential forces the Marcos Mantis into the pit lane for nearly an hour. James May, now in the #78 BMW, accidentally overran his pit box, partially blocking the Saxon Motorsport's BMW from exiting the garage. The #57 RJN Motorsport car's engine starts to overheat due to a broken fan, originally thinking they had fixed the problem, the car went back out but was soon back in the pits. A miscommunication caused the #26 GTS car to pit four times causing it to lose positions. Moore Racing's race went from good to catastrophic as both cars had issues; the #34 BMW suffering from a broken driveshaft as not long after the #63 Honda loses its right-front wheel coming out of Abbey.  The Paragon Motorsport Porsche takes second place away from the #32 Duller car as Fabrizio Gollin hops into the BMW M3 GTR, rejoining less than a lap behind the Porsche.

Hour 17

The Safety Car is sent out on track as the recovery of the Jemco Racing Marcos Mantis is ongoing at Bridge, after an off for the #36 car. During this, both Paragon and Rollcentre decide to pit their cars, but the Mosler was held as the field made its way past behind the Safety Car, after the Porsche had left the pits, but a quick stint from the Mosler and a scheduled brake change for the #39 car meant that Rollcentre came out on top and in third position overall. An engine mount halts the progress of the Team Scandal Lotus as the already-battered Chad Motorsport Mosler has a problem with a broken wishbone.

Hour 18

The Chesterton Marcos, with its "new" gearbox, turns out to only have fifth gear now, with Oliver Bryant saying the car is still capable of times of 2:05. The Jemco Marcos is back out on track after rear damper put Leigh Smart off and into the gravel at Bridge, the car running just out of the top 40. The leading Duller Motorsport BMW Z4 is beginning to gradually lap its sister M3, 17 laps at the moment as the Rollcentre Mosler is on a charge to at least catch the latter. A notable team and bunch of cars throughout the race were the County EMC Porsche 968s which have had a clear race, both running relatively close to each other, rounding out the top 20 cars.

Hour 19

The #24 Topcats Marcos has left the pit lane but suddenly ground to a halt at Brooklands, bringing out the Safety Car again. The #10 Chad Mosler in a small bit of trouble as a spin going out of Vale costs it some time. Nick Leventis' EDM BMW makes contact with the Mardi Gras Honda, damaging the exhaust, sending the GTC Class car down the order while repairs are made. Meanwhile, the #28 Morgan has run trouble-free for the entirety of the race. Duller Motorsport's BMW M3 hits trouble as the smoke billows from it in front of Steve Warburton on the pit straight, this allows Rollcentre and Paragon to grab second and third, leaving the M3 far behind while attention is given to the #32.

Hour 20

The Stig, now in the #78 car, was trying to gain more positions, though this would be obstructed as the front splitter had come off, as well as a fuel leak. Stig stayed in the car so he could continue after the leak was fixed. Torquespeed is the next BMW to have a problem, as smoke pours from the car with Warburton at the wheel. Fortunately, the team manage to amend the problem and sends the car back out without a problem. At the RJN Motorsport team, the #40 car has lost third and fifth gear, resulting in a second gearbox change. Despite an aerodynamic disadvantage, Stig's handling of the car was phenomenal. He later pitted to hand over to Richard Hammond, who was in his final stint. The #32 Duller car returns to the pits on a flatbed truck, an assumed gearbox failure. While this is happening, the #15 Chad Porsche, after its wheel nut issues, has climbed back through the field, now less than a minute off of the GTS BMW, which will soon become the battle for 4th place as the Duller car is out for the time being. Fortunately, Duller has worked wonders in replacing a right driveshaft, the M3 rejoining in fourth place although five laps down on the #39 Porsche. The #63 Moore Honda's engine finally gives way to damage with Miles Hulford at the wheel.

Hour 21

BMW woes continue to occur as GTS Motorsport BMW's draftshaft fails dropping it to ninth. A puncture occurs on the #32 Duller BMW just as or after Marcel Fässler, the #45 CWS Racing doing well to avoid him and carry on as Fässler drags his BMW back to the pits. Dirk Werner hops into the leading BMW for the penultimate stint, 23 laps ahead of the Rollcentre Mosler. Apex Motorsport's Jaguar rejoins the race after a brief stop in the pits. While sitting 15th overall and second in Class 4, the #77 Marcos Racing International BMW 120d pulls off and onto the grass on the Hangar Straight, not requiring a Safety Car.

Hour 22

The #15 Porsche moves up into the top five as Martin Rich pits the Eclipse Mosler, George Haynes taking over. Trouble for the Rollcentre Racing team as the car loses every gear but fifth. The #77 Marcos Racing BMW returns to the pits, an empty diesel tank resulting in its stoppage on the Hangar Straight. Jeremy Clarkson got into the Top Gear BMW 330d for his final stint. The #2 Mosler pits with 8 laps on the Paragon car, the engine cover coming off and the last scheduled brake pad change of the race and quickly leaves the pitlane, assisted, still 3 laps ahead of the #39 Porsche.

Hour 23

It is not long until Haynes passes re-passes the Chad Porsche as the car makes its final pit stop. Just as the Chad car pits, the Safety Car comes out because of debris at Brooklands, meaning the Porsche cannot leave the pits until the rest of the field passes the pit exit, also held is the #20 911virgin.com Porsche. Once racing gets back underway, the #32 BMW is back in the pits for a quick splash of fuel and immediately heads back out, then comes in the #1 BMW, with Werner handing the car over to Jamie Campbell-Walter for the remaining time of the race. The leading Class 4 car, the #79 TH Motorsport Volkswagen Golf pits for a refuel, Mark Sumpter stepping into the #39 Paragon Porsche, Marcel Fässler pushing the BMW to its limit, trying to catch him. With only 75 minutes left, the leading Class 3 Honda Integra Type-R of Team Thrush hits electrical problems and only leading the #67 Pete Daniels Motorsport Honda by 6 laps. The #45 BMW is hit with a stop-go penalty for speeding in the pit lane, not affecting its position. In trying to quickly get out of the pit lane, Fässler picked up a penalty for speeding in the pit lane, making it even more problematic to catch up to and pass Sumpter. The Eclipse Mosler MT900R pits for a final splash of fuel to make it home ahead of the #15 car of Nigel Greensall in the battle for third GT3.

Hour 24

The #67 Honda takes the Class 3 lead from Team Thrush as they frantically try to fix the car to make the finish. Greensall, in an effort to catch the Mosler, sets the fastest lap but in doing so picks up two separate punctures. The drops him out of any contention for third in GT3 and into the clutches of the charging #26 GTS BMW. The Chad Motorsport team struggle to remove a wheel during the pit stop, causing them to drop behind GTS Motorsport, 911virgin.com Porsche and TJH Motorsport Honda, falling to 9th place. After a tedious repair job, which lost them the Class 3 lead, Team Thrush are finally able to send their functional Honda Integra Type-R, rejoining in Class 3. With half an hour to go, Campbell-Walter brings in the BMW, 29 laps clear of the next car, the win already in their hands. Chad Motorsport still struggle with their #15 car as the 964 Porsche takes 9th place. The Saxon Motorsport team hit trouble during their battle with Team Top Gear, relieving. Finally, the Chad Motorsport Porsche 997 GT3 Cup leaves the pit lane just as the Apex Motorsport Jaguar does after a pit stop longer than usual. Jamie Campbell-Walter takes a relatively easy second consecutive win for the Duller Motorsport team. The Rollcentre Mosler takes 2nd place, having maintained its 3 lap advantage on the Paragon Porsche which ends up in a very good 3rd place overall, and the GTC class win, in a 2002 Carrera Cup car. All three Moslers, as well as the Chad Porsche, cross the line in unison. After a hard second half of the race, the #32 Duller Motorsport BMW M3 GTR takes fourth ahead of the Eclipse Mosler. GTS Motorsport, after some highs and lows, end the race in 6th position and third in GTC ahead of the 911virgin.com crew in their 996 GT3 Cup car. TJH Motorsport take the Class 2 win in 8th overall after a relatively calm race with Simply Racing's Porsche 964 taking a well-earned Class 1 victory in such a vintage car. The Chad Motorsport team just manage to claim 10th ahead of Colin White's CWS Racing BMW M3 E46, which is second in Class 1. TH Motorsport's race was free of any trouble, a quiet race for the little Volkswagen Golf Diesel. After being practically gifted the Class 3 by Team Thrush's troubles, Pete Daniels Motorsport take the Class 3 win, with both cars crossing the line next to each other. Meanwhile, in third in Class 4, the remarkable Team Top Gear BMW 330d of Jeremy Clarkson practically begging the car to make the finish. He eventually crossed the line 39th overall, 3rd in class, a notable achievement for such an inexperienced group of drivers, bar The Stig (Ben Collins) who had raced in the 24 Hours of Le Mans prior, having huge accident damage, among other setbacks, to come home with a class podium in the Top Gear trio's first ever 24-hour race. Clarkson shouting "Yes! You brilliant little car! God, this is just brilliant. That's absolutely epic!" after crossing the line. Out of the 60 starters, 46 were classified at the end of the race, the last car being 286 laps behind the winner, being the #72 OJP Sport Racing Honda Civic.

Results

Class winners are in bold.

Notes

References

Britcar 24 Hour
Britcar 24 Hour
Britcar 24 Hour
Top Gear